Deadly Maria, is a 1993 German film directed by Tom Tykwer.

Cast 
 Nina Petri as Maria
 Katja Studt as Maria (age 16)
 Juliane Heinemann as Maria (age 10)
 Josef Bierbichler as Maria's father
 Peter Franke as Heinz
 Joachim Król as Dieter

External links
 

1993 films
German thriller drama films
Films directed by Tom Tykwer
Films with screenplays by Tom Tykwer
Films scored by Tom Tykwer
1993 directorial debut films
1990s German-language films
1990s German films